The 2001 United Kingdom budget, named "Investing for the Long Term: Building Opportunity and Prosperity for All", was presented by Gordon Brown, Chancellor of the Exchequer, to the House of Commons March 2001. As of June 2020 it is the most recent year in UK history that the government reported a budgetary surplus.

References 

United Kingdom budgets
Budget
United Kingdom
Gordon Brown